The 2012 FIBA European Championship for Small Countries was the 13th edition of the tournament, formerly known as the Promotion Cup or the FIBA EuroBasket Division C. It was played at Serravalle, San Marino, in 2–7 July.

The draw took place on 4 December 2011, in Freising, Germany. The Andorra national team was the final winner of the Championship.

First round

Group A

Group B

Second round for 5th to 7th place 

The game of the first round between the 3rd and 4th qualified of group B is included in this round.

Knockout stage

Semifinals

Bronze medal game

Final

Final standings

References

External links 
 Results from FIBA Europe website

2012
2012–13 in European basketball
2012 in San Marino
International basketball competitions hosted by San Marino